Roy Chamberlain "Polly" Wolfe was a professional baseball player. He played parts of two seasons in Major League Baseball, 1912 and 1914, for the Chicago White Sox, primarily as a right fielder. In 1912 he made one appearance as a pinch hitter, striking out. In 1914 he made eight appearances, seven playing right field, and one as a pinch hitter. He batted .214 for his career and made one error, which greatly affected his overall fielding percentage, (.875).

He is part of the select group of Major League Players to play at Wahconah Park.

Sources

Major League Baseball right fielders
Chicago White Sox players
Lincoln Abes players
Galesburg Pavers players
Pittsfield Electrics players
Lincoln Tigers players
Bloomington Bloomers players
Rock Island Islanders players
Wichita Jobbers players
Omaha Rourkes players
Petersburg Goobers players
Tarboro Tarbabies players
Baseball players from Illinois
People from Knoxville, Illinois
1888 births
1938 deaths